The Trouble with Maggie Cole is a British comedy-drama television series directed by Ben Gregor, and written by Mark Brotherhood. The show's first episode premiered on British television network ITV on 4 March 2020. It stars Dawn French in the role of Maggie Cole as well as Mark Heap, Julie Hesmondhalgh, Vicki Pepperdine, Patrick Robinson, Emily Reid and Gwyneth Keyworth.

Premise 
The six-part series takes place in the coastal village of Thurlbury and follows the local busybody Maggie Cole (Dawn French). Maggie refers to herself as the "local historian" and runs the local heritage/gift shop, while her husband Peter is the headmaster of the local primary school.

Production and filming 
The show was initially planned to be named Glass Houses while in production in early 2019. Filming for the series took place across South Devon and Cornwall, primarily in the village of Noss Mayo. Other locations where filming took place are Mothecombe, Launceston Castle, Cargreen, Burgh Island, Bigbury-on-Sea beach, Morwellham Quay, Saltash, and a primary school in Ivybridge.

Cast 

 Dawn French as Maggie Cole
 Mark Heap as Peter Cole
 Julie Hesmondhalgh as Jill Wheadon
 Vicki Pepperdine as Karen Saxton
 Patrick Robinson as Marcus Ormansby
 Phil Dunster as Jamie Cole
 Gwyneth Keyworth as Becka Cole
 Chetna Pandya as Dr. Carol Tomlin
 Jamie Talbot as Tommy Jarvis
 Emily Reid as Roxanna Dubiki
 Rocco Padden as Josh Roberts
 Joe Layton as Neil Roberts
 Lee Boardman as Brian Daniels
 Hollie Edwin as Sydney Hurst
 Laurie Kynaston as Liam Myer
 Kerry Howard as Kelly Roberts
 Tomi May as Emil Dubiki
 Arthur McBain as Alex Myer
 Karen Henthorn as Jenny Myer
 Shane Attwooll as Patrick
 Ray Strasser-King as Phil

Episodes

References

External links 
 
 

ITV comedy-dramas
2020 British television series debuts
2020s British drama television series
English-language television shows